Events in the year 1822 in Brazil.

Incumbents
King: John VI (until 7 September)
Emperor: Pedro I (starting 12 October)

Events
 18 February - Start of the War of Independence
 2 March - Start of the Siege of Salvador
 Dissolution of the United Kingdom of Portugal, Brazil and the Algarves
 7 September - Independence of Brazil
 Establishment of the Empire of Brazil
8 November - Battle of Pirajá

Deaths
 19 February - Joana Angélica
 23 December - Frei Galvão

References

 
1820s in Brazil
Years of the 19th century in Brazil
Brazil
Brazil